San Rafael Airport  is a public airport located  west of San Rafael, a city in the Mendoza Province of Argentina. It is also known as Suboficial Ayudante Santiago Germano Airport.

The San Rafael VOR (Ident: SRA) is located on the field.

Airlines and destinations

See also

Transport in Argentina
List of airports in Argentina

References

External links 
San Rafael Airport at OpenStreetMap

Airports in Argentina